William Lloyd Harding (October 3, 1877 – December 17, 1934) was an American Republican politician. He was the 22nd Governor of Iowa, from 1917 to 1921.

Early life
William Lloyd Harding, was born in Sibley, Iowa, on October 3, 1877.  He later lived in Sioux City.  From 1897 to 1901, he attended Morningside College, and then went on to earn his law degree from the University of South Dakota.

Political career
Harding entered politics in 1906, serving as a Republican member of the Iowa House of Representatives, a position he held for six years. He also served as Iowa's lieutenant governor from 1913 to 1917 during the terms of Republican governor George W. Clarke. Harding won the 1916 Republican gubernatorial nomination and then won the election in a landslide (winning 98 of 99 counties.) He was sworn into the governor's office on January 11, 1917.

Harding was reelected to a second term in 1918 and thus was governor during the four years which roughly coincided with World War I. During that time, there were "defense councils" in every state, following President Wilson's famous statement "the world must be made safe for democracy", and "millions of men and  women of German birth and native sympathy live amongst us....Should there be any disloyalty it will be dealt with a firm hand of repression."

Harding was convinced that assimilation would heighten patriotism and felt there is a connection between communication and assimilation. He also claimed that any foreign language provided an opportunity for the enemy to scatter propaganda.  Harding became the only governor in the United States to outlaw the public use of all foreign languages. He addressed those issues in an edict whose title was the Babel Proclamation, which prohibited all public communication in any language other than English. It forbade the use of foreign languages in public, over the telephone, in school, and in religious services.

Harding's time in office was marred by scandal and controversy. His hostility towards immigrants and foreign ethnic groups extended beyond Germans and included Iowans of Norwegian and Danish descent.

Censure
An investigation revealed an alleged bribe of $5,000 for the Governor's pardon of a felon convicted of rape.  Several resignations resulted, and an impeachment proposal was initiated but denied. A  censure motion was approved by a vote of 70-34.  He did not run again in 1920.

References 

1877 births
1934 deaths
Iowa lawyers
University of South Dakota alumni
Republican Party members of the Iowa House of Representatives
Lieutenant Governors of Iowa
Republican Party governors of Iowa
Politicians from Sioux City, Iowa
People from Sibley, Iowa
20th-century American politicians